Big Flats may refer to:
Big Flats, New York, a town
Big Flats (CDP), New York, a census-designated place
Big Flats, Wisconsin, a town
Big Flats (community), Wisconsin, an unincorporated community

See also
Big Flat, Arkansas
Big Flats Airport, New York, a community in Big Flats, New York